Major-General Laurence George Drummond  (13 March 1861 – 20 May 1946) was a British Army general officer.

Drummond saw active service in the Bechuanaland Expedition (1884–1885), the Fourth Anglo-Ashanti War (1895–1896), the Soudan Expedition, the Second Boer War, and the Great War of 1914–1918, and retired to Kent in 1920 to become a magistrate and a keen gardener.

Life
The only son of Admiral Sir James Robert Drummond, a younger son of Viscount Strathallan, by his marriage to Catherine Frances Elliot, Drummond was educated at Eton College and from 1874 to 1877 was second Page of Honour to Queen Victoria.

After training at the Royal Military College, Sandhurst, he was commissioned as a Second Lieutenant into the Coldstream Guards on 13 August 1879, but in September transferred to the Scots Guards. He saw active service on the Bechuanaland Expedition of 1884–1885 in command of a troop of Methuen's Horse, and on 3 May 1886, on his return from Bechuanaland, the Duke of Connaught presented him to his brother the Prince of Wales at a Levée at St James's Palace. The next day, 5 May 1886, Drummond married Katherine Mary Antrobus, the daughter of Hugh Lindsay Antrobus and Mary Adam and a granddaughter of Admiral Sir Charles Adam.

He was promoted Captain in 1888. From 1892 to 1897 he served as aide-de-camp to the Major-General commanding the Home District, during which period he commanded a Guards Company in the Special Service Corps and saw active service again on the Ashantee Expedition of 1895–1896, gaining the Ashanti Star, and in 1897 was promoted Major. In 1898 he joined the Soudan Expedition, when he was mentioned in despatches and decorated with the Queen's Medal and the Egyptian Medal. From 1898 to 1900 he was posted to Ottawa as Military Secretary to the Governor-General of Canada, the Earl of Minto, but he interrupted this posting in 1899 to return to South Africa, accompanying a Canadian contingent joining the war. One historian has said of Drummond's interlude in Canada – 

Drummond commanded the Kimberley Mounted Infantry from 1899 to 1900, being again mentioned in despatches and serving as a Staff officer with the 1st Division. After the Boer War he was appointed Assistant Staff Officer to the Inspector General of the Forces, then in 1904 was promoted Lieutenant-Colonel (later the same year Brevet-Colonel) commanding the third Battalion the Scots Guards. From 1908 to 1912 he commanded the 7th Infantry Brigade and in 1913 was promoted Major-General, serving throughout the Great War of 1914–1918, when he was again mentioned in despatches but held no divisional commands. He retired the service in 1920.

With his wife Katherine Mary (née Antrobus), Drummond had four children: Lindsay Drummond (1891–1951), Stella Katherine Drummond (1895–1982), Esme Drummond (died 1899), and James Arthur Lawrence Drummond (1905–1995). Their daughter Stella married the Conservative politician Lord Eustace Percy, who became Baron Percy of Newcastle.

Retirement
In retirement Drummond lived at Sissinghurst Place, Cranbrook, Kent, and he was appointed a Justice of the Peace and Deputy Lieutenant for the county. He was a member of the Turf and Bath Clubs and maintained extensive gardens at Sissinghurst. F. A. Mercer's Gardens and Gardening 1936, published in New York City, deals with the art of ornamental gardens around the world and includes many photographs of those of Sir Philip Sassoon at Port Lympne and Trent Park and of Drummond at Sissinghurst Place.

Drummond died on 20 May 1946 at the age of 85. His funeral took place four days later at Sissinghurst parish church, when his coffin was carried by sergeants of the Scots Guards, the regiment's pipers played a lament, and the Last Post was sounded.

Notes

External links
Laurence George Drummond portraits at National Portrait Gallery online
Maj.-Gen. Laurence George Drummond at thepeerage.com

1861 births
1946 deaths
British Army major generals
British Army personnel of the Anglo-Egyptian War
British Army personnel of the Second Boer War
British Army generals of World War I
Companions of the Order of the Bath
Commanders of the Order of the British Empire
Deputy Lieutenants of Kent
English justices of the peace
Members of the Royal Victorian Order
People educated at Eton College
People from Sissinghurst
Scots Guards officers
Coldstream Guards officers
Graduates of the Royal Military College, Sandhurst